The 2022–23 VCU Rams men's basketball team represented Virginia Commonwealth University during the 2022–23 NCAA Division I men's basketball season. They were led by sixth-year head coach is Mike Rhoades and played their home games at the Siegel Center in Richmond, Virginia as a member of the Atlantic 10 Conference.

VCU won their first Atlantic 10 men's basketball tournament title since 2015 and their first Atlantic 10 regular season title since 2021.

Previous season
The Rams finished the 2021–22 season 22–10, 14–4 in A-10 play to finish in a tie for second place. As the No. 3 seed in the A-10 tournament, they lost in the quarterfinals to Richmond. The Rams received an at-large bid to the National Invitation Tournament, their first since 2008, where they defeated Princeton before losing to Wake Forest in the second round.

Offseason

Departures

Incoming transfers

2022 recruiting class

Roster

Schedule and results
The Rams placed third in the Legends Classic.

|-
!colspan=12 style=| Exhibition

|-
!colspan=12 style=| Non-conference regular season

|-
!colspan=12 style=|Atlantic 10 regular season

|-
!colspan=12 style=| A-10 tournament

|-
!colspan=12 style=| NCAA tournament

Source:

See also 

 2022–23 VCU Rams women's basketball team

References

External links
 VCU Basketball

VCU
VCU Rams men's basketball seasons
VCU
VCU Rams men's basketball
VCU Rams men's basketball
VCU Rams men's basketball
VCU Rams men's basketball